Hy Zaret (born Hyman Harry Zaritsky; August 21, 1907 – July 2, 2007) was an American Tin Pan Alley lyricist and composer who wrote the lyrics of the 1955 hit "Unchained Melody,"  one of the most recorded songs of the 20th century.

Personal life
Zaret was born on August 21, 1907 in New York City to Max Zaritsky and Dora Shiffman, who had emigrated from Russia in the 1890s. He attended West Virginia University and Brooklyn Law School, where he received an LLB. He shortened his name legally from Zaritsky to Zaret in 1934. Zaret served in the Army's Special Services division during World War II.

Zaret had two sons, and was married to the former Shirley Goidel. He died at his home in Westport, Connecticut on July 2, 2007, at the age of 99.

Career
He scored his first major success in 1937, when he teamed up with Saul Chaplin and Sammy Cahn to co-write the pop standard "Dedicated to You."  The early 1940s brought some collaborations with Alex C. Kramer and Joan Whitney, including 1941's "It All Comes Back to Me Now" and the socially conscious, WWII-themed "My Sister and I." In 1941 Vaughn Monroe had a top 5 hit with the song “There I Go,” which Zaret co-wrote with Irving Weiser.

Zaret wrote the lyrics for an English translation of the French Resistance song "La Complainte du Partisan" ("The Song of the French Partisan"). The song became popular after it was recorded by Leonard Cohen and others as "The Partisan".  In 1944 he and Lou Singer wrote the popular hit novelty song "One Meatball", based on a song popular among Harvard undergraduates.

"Unchained Melody"
Zaret's biggest success, though, was "Unchained Melody," a song he co-wrote with film composer Alex North for the 1955 prison film Unchained (hence the title), which was nominated for the Academy Award for Best Original Song. No fewer than three versions of the song—by Les Baxter, Al Hibbler, and Roy Hamilton—hit the U.S. Top Ten that year, with Hibbler's version ranking as the best-known for the next ten years. The song was also recorded successfully by Eddie Fisher, whose version bowled over critics, Jimmy Young and Liberace, and covered by countless others. And The Righteous Brothers' 1965 version was perhaps the biggest selling version, reaching the U.S. pop Top Five. That recording was revived in 1990 thanks to its inclusion in the film, Ghost, and nearly reached the U.S. Top Ten all over again, whilst it reached No.1 in the U.K on this release.  Elvis Presley, Sam Cooke, Cliff Richard, Roy Orbison and Donny Osmond also recorded versions of the song. This song is unique in that it has made No.1 on the U.K. singles charts in four different guises by four different artists over a period of nearly fifty years: Jimmy Young (1955), The Righteous Brothers (1990), Robson & Jerome (1995) and Gareth Gates (2002). The latter three versions have all recorded certified sales in excess of one million copies in the U.K. alone.

Children's music
Zaret turned his attention to educational children's music in the late 1950s, collaborating with Lou Singer on a six-album series called "Ballads for the Age of Science"; different volumes covered space, energy and motion, experiments, weather, and nature. The records were quite successful, and the songs "Why Does the Sun Shine?" (aka "The Sun Is a Mass of Incandescent Gas") and "A Shooting Star Is Not a Star" were even covered by alternative rock band They Might Be Giants in 1993 and 2009, respectively. (source: Steve Huey, Allmusic)

See also
 Great American Songbook Foundation - where Hy Zaret's papers are housed. A collection guide can be found here

References

External links
ASCAP Foundation Living Video Archive interview Hy Zaret 

Great American Songbook Foundation 
Argosy Music Corp.
History of Little Songs
Publishing administrator for "Unchained Melody"

1907 births
2007 deaths
20th-century American Jews
20th-century American musicians
21st-century American Jews
Brooklyn Law School alumni
Jewish American songwriters
Musicians from New York City
People from Westport, Connecticut
Songwriters from New York (state)
American people of Russian-Jewish descent